</noinclude>
This list of awards for contributions to culture is an index to articles about notable awards for contributions to culture in a general sense. The awards listed here have a relatively open-ended scope, e.g. they apply to the arts irrespective of category. Alternatively, they pertain to a culture-related field that is not covered by a more specific list, such as promotion of culture, conservation of cultural heritage, museums, etc. The list is organized by region and country of the award sponsor, but some awards are open to people or organizations around the world.

List

See also
 The Best in Heritage

References

 
contributions to culture